The 1971 Scottish League Cup final was played on 23 October 1971 and was the final of the 26th Scottish League Cup competition. Newly promoted Partick Thistle beat Celtic, who had played in the European Cup final in 1970, in a major upset. Sam Leitch, a presenter of BBC sports show Grandstand, previewed the game by saying that:

Thistle went 4–0 up inside 37 minutes, causing the reported crowd of 62,470 to allegedly be swelled by many thousands of Rangers fans who were keen to see their Old Firm rivals be humiliated. Kenny Dalglish pulled a goal back for Celtic in the second half, but Thistle held on to win 4–1.

Match details

References

External links
 Soccerbase
 TheCelticWiki

1971
League Cup Final
Scottish League Cup Final 1971
Scottish League Cup Final 1971
1970s in Glasgow
October 1971 sports events in the United Kingdom